Masoud Moeini (born 22 March 1949 in Sari, Iran) is a retired Iranian football player who has played for the Iran national team and Taj. His brother, Fereydoun is also a former footballer and a teacher at the universities and was also team manager of Iran national football team.

References

1949 births
Living people
Iranian footballers
Rah Ahan players
Esteghlal F.C. players
Association footballers not categorized by position